Uraltau (Ural-Taw) is a rural locality (a selo) in Abzakovsky Selsoviet, Beloretsky District, Bashkortostan, Russia. The population was 78 as of 2010. There is 1 street.

Geography 
Uraltau is located 13 km east of Beloretsk (the district's administrative centre) by road. Karagayly is the nearest rural locality.

References 

Rural localities in Beloretsky District